Matteo Boccaccini (born 8 February 1993) is an Italian footballer who plays as a defender for Athletic Carpi in Serie D.

Club career
On 20 July 2012 Boccaccini left the reserve team of Bologna for Lega Pro Seconda Divisione club Fano. in the following season he was signed by Bellaria.

On 27 June 2014, few days before the closure of 2013–14 financial year of most clubs, in order to raise paper profit, Boccaccini was swapped with Gianmarco Gerevini of Brescia, both valued at €800,000. Boccaccini signed a 3-year contract. Boccaccini failed to play any Serie B games for the Lombard club, which on 1 February 2015 he was sent to Slovenia along with Daniele Ferri, who joined Brescia in 2012 for a flopped €2.4 million price tag at that time.

On 1 February 2016 Boccaccini left for Krka in a temporary deal. After Krka, Boccaccini also played for FK Željezničar Sarajevo from 2016 to 2017 and AS Sasso Marconi from 2017 to 2018.

Since the summer of 2018, Boccaccini has been playing for Italian Serie C club Ravenna.

On 26 July 2019, he signed with Rimini. After just two games for Rimini, on 2 September 2019 he moved to Carpi, signing a 2-year contract.

On 22 September 2020 he moved to Serie D club Prato. On 1 February 2021 he returned to Ravenna.

References

External links

Living people
1993 births
Italian footballers
Association football defenders
Alma Juventus Fano 1906 players
A.C. Bellaria Igea Marina players
ND Gorica players
NK Krka players
FK Željezničar Sarajevo players
Ravenna F.C. players
Rimini F.C. 1912 players
A.C. Carpi players
A.C. Prato players
Slovenian PrvaLiga players
Premier League of Bosnia and Herzegovina players
Serie C players
Serie D players
Italian expatriate footballers
Italian expatriate sportspeople in Slovenia
Expatriate footballers in Slovenia
Expatriate footballers in Bosnia and Herzegovina